103rd (Lancashire Artillery Volunteers) Regiment Royal Artillery is part of the Army Reserve and primarily has sub-units throughout the Greater Manchester and Merseyside area of the North-West of England, in recent years it has extended its footprint to Wolverhampton, Isle of Man, Carlisle and Nottingham. Its purpose is to provide reinforcements for units that use the 105 mm L118 Light Gun.

Formation 
The Lancashire Artillery Volunteers were first raised in 1859 as part of the Volunteer Force raised in response to threats of French Invasion. A total of 23 Artillery companies were raised initially. However, in Manchester, numerous units that would later form the Lancashire Artillery Gunners had existed from as early as 1804, when the Duke of Gloucester inspected the Heaton Artillery Volunteers before they were shipped off to the fronts of the Napoleonic Wars.

20th Century History 
Officers and men of the Lancashire Artillery Volunteers continued to give service during the two world wars of the 20th Century.

In 1967, some of these units were amalgamated to form 103rd (Lancashire Artillery Volunteers) Light Air Defence Regiment Royal Artillery (Volunteers). Its units were Headquarters Battery at Liverpool, 208 (3rd West Lancashire) Light Air Defence Battery at Liverpool and 209 (The Manchester Artillery) Light Air Defence Battery at Manchester. In 1969 213 (South Lancashire Artillery) Light Air Defence Battery was formed at St Helens and joined the regiment.

In 1976, the regiment changed its designation to 103rd (Lancashire Artillery Volunteers) Air Defence Regiment Royal Artillery (Volunteers) upon being equipped with the Blowpipe missile air-defense weapon. Then, in 1986, 216 (The Bolton Artillery) Battery was formed at Bolton and joined the regiment.

In 1992, as a result of the Options for Change, the regiment lost one Air-Defence Battery (213 Air-Defense Battery, which was amalgamated with HQ Battery at St Helens) and Regimental Headquarters were moved from Deysbrooke Barracks, Liverpool, to St. Helens to be co-located with HQ Battery.

Modern day 
In 2001, the regiment transferred from Air Defence to the Field Artillery as a Light Gun Regiment.

Under Army 2020, 209 (Manchester & St Helens) Battery Royal Artillery increased to a battery size. 210 (Staffordshire) Battery Royal Artillery, based in Wolverhampton, joined this regiment from 106th (Yeomanry) Regiment Royal Artillery, and re-roled to a light gun battery. 103 Regiment is paired with the regular 4th Regiment RA under the 1st Artillery Brigade.

The current structure of the regiment is as follows:

 Regimental Headquarters, at Jubilee Barracks, Saint Helens
 Lancashire Artillery Volunteers Band, at Nelson Street Army Reserve Centre, Bolton
 Lancashire Artillery Pipes and Drums
 Headquarters Troop, at Jubilee Barracks, Saint Helens
 208 (3rd West Lancashire) Battery, at Brigadier Philip Toosy Barracks, Liverpool
 Manx Troop, at Lord Street Army Reserve Centre, Douglas, Isle of Man – formed in 2015
 209 (Manchester Artillery) Battery, at Belle Vue Street Army Reserve Centre, Manchester
 210 (Staffordshire) Battery, at Wolseley House, Wolverhampton
 C (South Nottinghamshire Hussars, Royal Horse Artillery) Troop, at Hucknall Lane Army Reserve Centre, Bulwell – formed in 2018
 216 (Bolton Artillery) Battery, at Nelson Street Army Reserve Centre, Bolton

Equipment 
The 103rd Regiment is equipped with the 105mm Light Gun, a versatile, air-portable and air-mobile artillery piece.

Freedoms

The regiment has received the freedom of several locations throughout its history; these include:
  14 October 2017: Liverpool (208 (3rd West Lancashire) Battery). 
  27 October 2020: Manchester (209 (Manchester Artillery) Battery).

References

Publications
 Litchfield, Norman E H, and Westlake, R, 1982.  The Volunteer Artillery 1859-1908, The Sherwood Press, Nottingham. 
 Litchfield, Norman E H, 1992.  The Territorial Artillery 1908-1988, The Sherwood Press, Nottingham.

External links 
 Official site

Royal Artillery regiments
Military units and formations in Lancashire
Military units and formations in Manchester
Military units and formations established in 1859
1859 establishments in the United Kingdom